The ITEC Knights are a Division 1 cricket team representing the province of Free State in South African domestic competitions. The Knights take part in the CSA 4-Day Series first-class competition, the Momentum One-Day Cup and the Mzansi Super League T20 competition. The team's home venue is the Mangaung Oval in Bloemfontein.

History 
The Knights were originally established as an entirely professional franchise team following reforms that were carried out to the South African domestic leagues in 2004-05. Traditionally, from 1893-94 to 2004-05, eleven provincial teams (with occasional additions) had competed in the Currie Cup. In 2004-05, the eleven provincial teams were rationalised into six new, entirely professional franchises, in all three formats. Griqualand West and Free State were merged to initially form the Diamond Eagles, before rebranding in 2010-11 as the Knights.

Orange Free State / Free State 

Orange Free State (as the province was then called) competed in the Currie Cup until 1995-6, without much success. With their first season taking place in 1897-98, Orange Free State had to wait until 1992-93 to secure their first title win. Orange Free State subsequently secured a second title win the following year. From 1995, Orange Free State became Free State in reflection of the political changes that took place in the country during this time. Free State achieved one more title win in 1997-98, as well as continued success in one-day competitions.

Franchise Era 
Following the 2004-05 domestic reforms, the provincial teams of Griqualand West and Free State were merged to form the Diamond Eagles franchise. The Eagles found success in the first complete franchise season, achieving a shared title win with the Dolphins (formerly Natal / KwaZulu-Natal). An outright, and most recent, 4-day first-class title came in 2007-08. The Eagles also claimed the one-day MTN Championship trophy in 2004-5, 2005-06 and most recently in 2010-11. Success was also quick in coming with the relatively new notion of T20 cricket, winning the Pro20 Series in both 2003-04 and 2005-06. 

The franchise name was changed for the 2010-11 season across all three formats, with the Eagles becoming the Knights. Like many of the other franchises, sponsorship rights were granted for the beginning of the team name. Until 2021, the official name of the team was the VKB Knights before a new deal was signed, becoming the current ITEC Knights.

Return to Provincial Cricket 
In 2020, domestic cricket in South Africa was restructured once more and the six former franchise teams were dropped. In its place was a return to the more traditional two-division league format, with a total of fifteen professional teams competing. The previously semi-professional provincial cricket league has been absorbed, effectively forming the leagues second division. Promotion and relegation between the two divisions, not seen since the start of the franchise era in 2004, will return after 2023-24.

The former name of Free State could have returned during this time as the Knights are the only representative team from the province. The Free State Cricket Union however decided to maintain the brand recognition from the franchise era, with the new team continuing to be called the Knights.

Playing kit
During the Momentum one-day Cup, the Knights' play in dark blue shirts and trousers with gold accents; for the CSA T20 Challenge they wear dark blue shirts with gold accents and gold trousers with dark blue accents. Their current kit provider is TK Sports.

Squad
Players with international caps are listed in bold.

This list represents the Knights squad for the 2019/20 season and active amateurs players who have represented them in 2018/19 and 2019/20.

Champions League Twenty20

Qualification and first round

Diamond Eagles finished second in the 2009 Standard Bank Pro20 and became eligible to play in the 2009 Champions League Twenty20. The team was placed in Group B with New South Wales Blues and Sussex Sharks. The team lost their first match against the New South Wales Blues and were not able to make 100 runs and stayed on 91/9 but the second match went for a tied with Sussex Sharks in which the scores were tied at 119/7 (Sussex) and 119/4(Eagles). Eagles clinched the Super Over. In the Super Over Eagles scored 9/1 while Sussex were knocked of the first two balls by Cornelius de Villiers and the Man of the Match was awarded to Rilee Rossouw.

Second round

After some twists and turns Eagles made it to the next round where they were placed in League A with New South Wales Blues, Somerset Sabres and Trinidad and Tobago. They were counted as a loss to Blues as their previous result and a win against the Somerset Sabres but lost against the Trinidad side in a must-win match. CJ de Villiers again performed well in the game against Somerset CCC. They didn't qualify for the semis but earned 7th out of 12 teams.

Honours
 SuperSport Series (1) - 2007–08 ; shared (1) - 2004–05
 MTN Championship (2) - 2004–05, 2005–06, 2010–11
 Pro20 Series (2) - 2003–04, 2005–06

References

 South African Cricket Annual – various editions
 Wisden Cricketers' Almanack – various editions

External sources
 Knights website

2003 establishments in South Africa
South African first-class cricket teams
Bloemfontein
Goodyear Tire and Rubber Company
Cricket clubs established in 2003
Cricket in the Free State (province)
Cricket in the Northern Cape